The 2011–12 season was Bologna Football Club's 102nd in existence and 4th consecutive season in the top flight of Italian football.

Season review
Having parted ways with Alberto Malesani during the offseason, Bologna began the season with a new head coach, Pierpaolo Bisoli.  Under Bisoli, Bologna started the Serie A season very poorly.  They managed just 1 point from their first five league games, while scoring only 2 goals and conceding 10.  Following the 2–0 defeat to Udinese, Bologna sacked Bisoli after five games in charge and replaced him with Stefano Pioli.  Pioli took over the club, himself having already been fired by Palermo earlier in the season.

In Pioli's debut, Bologna picked up their first win of the season with a 2–0 victory away to Novara.  They continued to find their footing in the league winning three of the first four games under their new manager.  Bologna finished the season in ninth place, earning Stefano Pioli a contract extension. The club was led by their captain Marco Di Vaio, who scored 10 goals for the club and formed a lethal attacking trident alongside Alessandro Diamanti and Gastón Ramírez. Prior to the end of the season, Di Vaio announced it would be his last at Serie A, as he bid farewell to Bologna in order to finish his career with the Montreal Impact of Major League Soccer (MLS).

Kit
The kits for the 2011–12 season were made by Macron.  The home kit features the traditional red and blue stripes with yellow inserts. The home shorts are white with red and blue details.  The away kit is a white shirt with red and blue details, paired with blue shorts. The third kit is sky blue with red and blue details, a tribute to Uruguay, as a way to celebrate the historic "twinning" between Bologna and the South American country that has provided the Rossoblù many foreign players in its history.  The main sponsor for the season's shirts is NGM Mobile, with Serenissima Ceramica also sponsoring the home kits and Manifatture Ceramiche on the away uniforms.

Players

Statistics

Appearances and goals
{| class="wikitable" style="text-align:center"
|-
!rowspan="2" valign="bottom"|No.
!rowspan="2" valign="bottom"|Pos.
!rowspan="2" valign="bottom"|Name
!colspan="2" width="85"|League
!colspan="2" width="85"|Coppa Italia
!colspan="2" width="85"|Total
!colspan="2" width="85"|Discipline
|-
!Apps
!Goals
!Apps
!Goals
!Apps
!Goals
!
!
|-
|align="left"|1||align="left"|GK||align="left"| Jean-François Gillet
|29||0||1||0||30||0||0||0
|-
|align="left"|3||align="left"|DF||align="left"| Archimede Morleo
|25(4)||0||1(1)||0||26(5)||0||5||2
|-
|align="left"|4||align="left"|MF||align="left"| Rene Krhin
|4(3)||1||1(1)||0||5(4)||1||2||0
|-
|align="left"|5||align="left"|DF||align="left"| Mikael Antonsson
|22(2)||0||0||0||22(2)||0||1||0
|-
|align="left"|6||align="left"|MF||align="left"| Saphir Taïder
|9(5)||0||2||0||11(5)||0||4||0
|-
|align="left"|7||align="left"|FW||align="left"| Francesco Della Rocca
|0||0||0(1)||1||0(1)||1||0||0
|-
|align="left"|8||align="left"|DF||align="left"| György Garics
|12(6)||1||2||0||14(6)||1||0||0
|-
|align="left"|9||align="left"|FW||align="left"| Marco Di Vaio
|32(5)||10||1||0||33(5)||10||5||0
|-
|align="left"|10||align="left"|MF||align="left"| Gastón Ramírez
|28(5)||8||0||0||28(5)||8||8||0
|-
|align="left"|13||align="left"|MF||align="left"| Nico Pulzetti
|16(9)||0||2||0||18(9)||0||6||0
|-
|align="left"|15||align="left"|MF||align="left"| Diego Pérez
|27(1)||0||2||0||29(1)||0||15||0
|-
|align="left"|16||align="left"|MF||align="left"| Federico Casarini
|8(3)||0||2||0||10(3)||0||2||0
|-
|align="left"|17||align="left"|FW||align="left"| Daniele Vantaggiato
|0(2)||0||2||1||2(2)||1||0||0
|-
|align="left"|19||align="left"|MF||align="left"| Luigi Vitale
|0||0||0||0||0||0||0||0
|-
|align="left"|21||align="left"|DF||align="left"| Nicolò Cherubin
|14(7)||1||2||0||16(7)||1||6||0
|-
|align="left"|22||align="left"|DF||align="left"| Cesare Rickler
|0||0||1||0||1||0||0||1
|-
|align="left"|23||align="left"|MF||align="left"| Alessandro Diamanti
|27(3)||7||2||1||29(3)||8||6||0
|-
|align="left"|25||align="left"|GK||align="left"| Federico Agliardi
|9(1)||0||2||0||11(1)||0||0||0
|-
|align="left"|26||align="left"|MF||align="left"| Gaby Mudingayi
|33(1)||0||1(1)||0||34(2)||0||11||0
|-
|align="left"|32||align="left"|GK||align="left"| Dejan Stojanović
|0||0||0||0||0||0||0||0
|-
|align="left"|33||align="left"|MF||align="left"| Panagiotis Kone
|18(13)||1||0||0||18(13)||1||7||0
|-
|align="left"|35||align="left"|FW||align="left"| Daniele Paponi
|0(1)||0||0(3)||1||0(4)||1||0||0
|-
|align="left"|43||align="left"|DF||align="left"| Frederik Sørensen
|1(1)||1||0||0||1(1)||1||1||0
|-
|align="left"|44||align="left"|GK||align="left"| Filippo Lombardi
|0||0||0||0||0||0||0||0
|-
|align="left"|48||align="left"|DF||align="left"| Matteo Rubin
|12(2)||1||2||0||14(2)||1||3||0
|-
|align="left"|51||align="left"|DF||align="left"| Simone Loria
|7(2)||1||1||0||8(2)||1||3||0
|-
|align="left"|75||align="left"|DF||align="left"| José Ángel Crespo
|3(4)||0||2||0||5(4)||0||0||0
|-
|align="left"|77||align="left"|FW||align="left"| Henry Damián Giménez
|2(12)||0||2(1)||1||4(13)||1||2||0
|-
|align="left"|78||align="left"|FW||align="left"| Ishak Belfodil
|1(7)||0||0||0||1(7)||0||1||0
|-
|align="left"|84||align="left"|DF||align="left"| Andrea Raggi
|31||0||1||1||32||1||4||0
|-
|align="left"|90||align="left"|DF||align="left"| Daniele Portanova
|34||3||1||1||35||4||8||1
|-
|align="left"|99||align="left"|FW||align="left"| Robert Acquafresca
|17(15)||5||2||0||19(15)||5||3||0
|-
|align="left"|-||align="left"|MF||align="left"| Riccardo Casini
|0||0||0(1)||0||0(1)||0||0||0
|-

Top scorers
Includes all competitive matches. The list is sorted by shirt number when total goals are equal.

{| class="wikitable" style="font-size: 95%; text-align: center;"
|-
!width=15|
!width=15|
!width=15|
!width=15|
!width=150|Name
!width=80|Serie A
!width=80|Coppa Italia
!width=80|Total
|-
|1
|9
|FW
|
|Marco Di Vaio
|10
|0
|10
|-
|2
|10
|AM
|
|Gastón Ramírez
|8
|0
|8
|-
|=
|23
|AM
|
|Alessandro Diamanti
|7
|1
|8
|-
|4
|99
|FW
|
|Robert Acquafresca
|5
|0
|5
|-
|5
|90
|CB
|
|Daniele Portanova
|3
|1
|4
|-

Most appearances
Includes all competitive matches.

{| class="wikitable" style="font-size: 95%; text-align: center;"
|-
!width=15|
!width=15|
!width=15|
!width=15|
!width=150|Name
!width=80|Serie A
!width=80|Coppa Italia
!width=80|Total
|-
|1
|9
|FW
|
|Marco Di Vaio
|37
|1
|38
|-
|2
|26
|CM
|
|Gaby Mudingayi
|34
|2
|36
|-
|3
|90
|CB
|
|Daniele Portanova
|34
|1
|35
|-
|4
|99
|FW
|
|Robert Acquafresca
|32
|2
|34
|-
|5
|10
|AM
|
|Gastón Ramírez
|33
|0
|33
|-

Club

Coaching staff

Medical staff

Other information

Competitions

Overall

Serie A

League table

Results summary

Results by round

Matches
The fixtures for the 2011–12 Serie A season were announced by the Lega Serie A on 27 July.

Coppa Italia

References

External links
Official Website 

2011-12
Italian football clubs 2011–12 season